Bastarm-e Olya (also Romanized as Bastarm-e ‘Olyā and Besterom-e Olyā) is a village in Hana Rural District, Abadeh Tashk District, Neyriz County, Fars Province, Iran. At the 2006 census, its population was 425, in 102 families.

References 

Populated places in Abadeh Tashk County